Christopher Joseph Hurley (born 20 November 1943) is an English former professional footballer who played in the Football League as a defender for Millwall. He joined Millwall from Rainham Town, and thereafter spent five seasons at Southern League club Dover. He joined another Southern League team, Wimbledon, in November 1971, and then played for Ashford Town (Kent).

References

1943 births
Living people
Footballers from Hornchurch
English footballers
Association football defenders
Rainham Town F.C. players
Millwall F.C. players
Dover F.C. players
Wimbledon F.C. players
Ashford United F.C. players
English Football League players
Southern Football League players